Andreas Widerberg (28 October 1766- 25 April 1810) 
was a Swedish stage actor.  He belonged to the elite of the pioneer generation actors of the Royal Dramatic Theatre. He was famous for his roles as hero and lover and noticed for his attractive looks.

Andreas Widerberg was the son of a bookkeeper in Gothenburg.  He was a star actor of the comedy house  Comediehuset  in Gothenburg in 1780-90. He was its artistic director under the supervision of Lovisa Simson (1746–1808) from 1786-90.  
In 1790, he attracted the attention of King Gustav III of Sweden  and was engaged at the Royal Dramatic Theatre in Stockholm.

He was married to the actress Anna Catharina Widebäck  (1765-1824) and the father of Henriette Widerberg (1796–1872).

References

Other sources
 Nordensvan, Georg, Svensk teater och svenska skådespelare från Gustav III till våra dagar. Förra delen, 1772-1842, Bonnier, Stockholm, 1917

1766 births
1810 deaths
People from Gothenburg
18th-century Swedish male actors
19th-century Swedish male actors
Swedish male stage actors
Swedish theatre directors